Lee Du-Haeng (born 25 December 1981) is a South Korean long-distance runner. At the 2012 Summer Olympics, he competed in the Men's marathon, finishing in 32nd place.

References

South Korean male long-distance runners
South Korean male marathon runners
Living people
Olympic athletes of South Korea
Athletes (track and field) at the 2012 Summer Olympics
Athletes (track and field) at the 2002 Asian Games
1981 births
Asian Games competitors for South Korea
South Korean male cross country runners
Olympic male marathon runners
Sportspeople from South Jeolla Province
21st-century South Korean people